Anna Purchase (born 15 September 1999) is a United States based English international athlete. She has represented England at the Commonwealth Games.

Biography
Purchase was educated at the University of Nebraska and then the University of California. She started throwing at the age of 13 and became only the second British woman to break the 70 metre barrier. She finished fourth at the 2021 European U23 Championships. 

In 2022, she was selected for the women's hammer throw event at the 2022 Commonwealth Games in Birmingham.

References

1999 births
Living people
English female hammer throwers
British female hammer throwers
Commonwealth Games competitors for England
Athletes (track and field) at the 2022 Commonwealth Games